The 2012 Fast5 Netball World Series was the fourth staging of the annual World Netball Series, and the first to be played under the new Fast5 rules, which replaced the older fastnet rules introduced in 2009. The tournament was held at Vector Arena in Auckland, the first time it had moved from its previous host nation England.

The 2012 tournament was contested by the six top national netball teams in 2012. New Zealand won the final against England, to record their third World Netball Fast5 series title.

Overview

Date and venue
The 2012 Fast5 Netball World Series was played in Auckland New Zealand over three days, from 9–11 November. All matches were held at Vector Arena, which has a capacity of 12,000.

Format
20 matches were played over three days, under new Fast5 rules. Each team played each other once during the first two days in a round-robin format. The four highest-scoring teams from this stage progressed to the finals, played on the final day of competition, in which the 1st-ranked team played the 4th-ranked team, while 2nd played 3rd. The winners of these two matches contested the Grand Final; the remaining teams contested the third- and fifth-place playoffs.

Teams
The competition was contested by the six top national netball teams in the world, according to the IFNA World Rankings: Australia, New Zealand, Jamaica, England, Malawi and South Africa.

Draw and results

Final Placings

References

 

2012
Fast5
Fast5
2012 in Australian netball
2012 in New Zealand netball
2012 in English netball
2012 in South African women's sport
2012 in Malawian sport
2012 in Jamaican sport